"All This Time" is a song by English musician Sting. It was released as the first single from his third studio album, The Soul Cages (1991), on 31 December 1990. The song was a chart success, especially in North America, reaching  5 on the US Billboard Hot 100 and topping the Billboard Album Rock Tracks chart, the Billboard Modern Rock Tracks chart, and the Canadian RPM Top Singles chart.

Lyrics
The lyrics provide a reference to the death of Sting's father, symbolized by the image of a young boy, Billy, who, at the death of his father, wishes to bury him at sea instead of going through the Catholic rites:

Despite the dark lyrics, the uptempo tune of the song foils their macabre undertone:

The imaginary character, Billy, is also referred to in the lyrics to the opening song on The Soul Cages, "Island Of Souls".

History
"All This Time" opened the set on The Soul Cages tour. After this, the song was not performed again until 2000 during the Brand New Day tour. The song lent its name to the ...All This Time live album which was recorded on September 11, 2001, at Sting's villa in Tuscany.

The music video depicts the wry, black humour of the song and is set aboard a cruise ship that constantly tilts from side to side. It features Melanie Griffith as a manicurist and Sting's wife Trudie Styler dressed as a French maid, and recreates the overcrowded stateroom scene from the Marx Brothers' 1935 film A Night at the Opera. As Sting's stateroom slowly fills with people, the two priests mentioned in the lyrics emerge from a bathtub, to the terror of a boy who is using it at the time, and the antics on the ship prompt a man on a dock to abandon his effort to drown himself and come aboard instead. The last verse is punctuated by a vaudeville performer attempting to do a dance routine while the spotlight keeps moving away from him; he finally gets fed up and storms off the stage. At the end of the video, when the priests enter the room, Sting throws his luggage out of the stateroom's porthole, jumps after it, and sinks slowly into the ocean as a lifebuoy is thrown toward him.

Track listings
7-inch and cassette single
 "All This Time"
 "I Miss You Kate" (instrumental)

12-inch and CD single
 "All This Time"
 "I Miss You Kate" (instrumental)
 "King of Pain" (live)

Japanese maxi-CD single
 "All This Time" (edit)
 "King of Pain" (live)
 "We'll Be Together" (extended mix)
 "Someone to Watch Over Me"
 "I Miss You Kate"

Charts

Weekly charts

Year-end charts

See also
 List of European number-one airplay songs of the 1990s
 List of number-one mainstream rock hits (U.S.)
 List of number-one modern rock hits of 1991 (U.S.)
 List of RPM number-one singles of 1991

References

1990 singles
1990 songs
A&M Records singles
RPM Top Singles number-one singles
Song recordings produced by Hugh Padgham
Songs written by Sting (musician)
Sting (musician) songs